Robby Henson is an American director and screenwriter.

Biography
Robby Henson began his directing career at Tisch School of the Arts at New York University. Henson is now a skilled film and documentary maker. He writes and directs all his films, which are known for being character-driven. His work has attracted such acclaimed actors Billy Bob Thornton, Patricia Arquette, Patricia Clarkson, Chris Cooper, William Devane and Kris Kristofferson. Beyond his work in film, Henson is also a prolific theater director, his family owning the famous outdoor theater, "Pioneer Playhouse" in Danville, Kentucky.

Filmography
 House (2007)
 Thr3e (2006)
 The Visitation (2006)
 The Badge (2002)
 Ghost Stories episode 28 (1997)
 Exodus 1947 (1997)
 Pharaoh's Army (1995)
 Trouble Behind (1991) a film about the Corbin, Kentucky race riot of 1919

References

External links

American male screenwriters
American theatre directors
Living people
Writers from Danville, Kentucky
Tisch School of the Arts alumni
Film directors from Kentucky
Year of birth missing (living people)